Maricela Cornejo (born 16 April 1987, Prosser, Washington, USA) is a women's professional boxer.

Cornejo is a former WBC international female super middleweight title, winning the title in 2015 against Latashia Burton at Mana Studios in Miami, Florida. Eight months later, Cornejo fought for the vacant WBC World female Middleweight title against Kali Reis at The Trusts Arena in Auckland, New Zealand. She lost the bout by a controversial split decision, however she did make history by being part of the first major world title fight that was held in New Zealand.

Professional boxing titles
World Boxing Council 
WBC International female super middleweight title (162¾ Ibs)

Professional boxing record

References

1987 births
Living people
American women boxers
Super-middleweight boxers
21st-century American women